The 1933–35 Central European International Cup was the third edition of the Central European International Cup played between 1933 and 1935. It was played in a round robin tournament between five teams involved in the tournament.

Final standings

Matches

Winner

Statistics

Goalscorers

References

External links

Central European International Cup